The 1899-1900 season was the first season for FC Barcelona. During this season, the club only played friendly matches against local clubs.

Events 
On 22 October 1899, a sports weekly printed in Barcelona, Los Deportes, published an advert in which Hans Gamper, a 21-year-old German-speaking Swiss, called for football fans.

Football Club Barcelona was created on 29 November of the same year, after a meeting held at Gimnasio Solé, a gym located at number 5 Montjuïc del Carme Street, in Barcelona's El Raval. Walter Wild, Luis de Ossó, Bartomeu Terradas, Otto Künzli, Otto Maier, Enric Ducay, Pere Cabot, Carles Puyol, Josep Llobet, John Parsons, William Parsons, and Joan Gamper signed the record.

On 8 December, Barcelona played their first match, at the former Velódromo de la Bonanova, against some Englishmen who had settled in the city. Both teams played with 10-men squads. The English Colony won 0–1 thanks to a goal from Arthur Witty.

The first board of directors was established on 14 December. Walter Wild was elected chairman since he was the oldest of the members. Terrades was appointed treasurer, Ossó as secretary, Gamper as the team's first-ever captain, and the Parsons brothers as vice-president and vice-captain respectively. Dark blue and garnet were the chosen colours for the uniform, the same colours of Gamper's former Swiss team, FC Basel. The badge was to be the same as the coat of arms of the city. The membership fee was set at two pesetas. 

On 11 February, the Englishman Stanley Harris becomes the first player in the history of the club to be sent off in the match played against Català FC, which was using 6 members of Escocès FC. In addition to Harris, Willie Gold, the Scottish player who had received the foul, returned with a punch and was also sent off. The incident caused a fight between players of both teams and as a result, Joan Gamper, Barça's captain in this match, resigned from the position.

On 14 February, Barcelona's third assembly completed the board of directors with Ernest Witty (sub-captain) (replacing William Parsons) and Joan Millet (sub-secretary). In this meeting, Gamper is urged to withdraw his resignation, not considering the incidents of the previous match sufficient. Barcelona refused to play any team with Scottish players in their ranks for a year if an apology was not received, but both Català and Escocès refused to do so, stating that those Scots are members of Català, and therefore, the rest of the 1899–1900 Catalan season was just confrontations between Escocès and Català. Following a 3-month hiatus without playing (Feb - May), Barcelona finally played again on 24 May against Team Rojo, a team formed by a group of dissident players of Català, their established city rivals.

Squad
Source:

Friendly matches

External links

References

Barcelona
FC Barcelona seasons
Barcelona